Beinn Tarsuinn (934 m) is a mountain in the Northwest Highlands of Wester Ross, Scotland. It lies in the heart of the remote Dundonnell and Fisherfield Forest.

The climb to the summit can either start from the south at Kinlochewe, or from the north which takes in all the Fisherfield Munros.

References

Mountains and hills of the Northwest Highlands
Marilyns of Scotland
Munros